Ros(s)carrock may refer to:

Rosscarrock, Calgary
Roscarrock, St Endellion, named for the Roscarrock family
Francis Roscarrock, English politician
Thomas Roscarrock, MP for Liskeard (UK Parliament constituency)
Richard Roscarrock, MP for Cornwall (UK Parliament constituency)